ROWVA High School, ROWVA Senior High School, or RHS, is a public four-year high school located at 346 East ROVA Drive in Oneida, Illinois, a village in Knox County, Illinois, in the Midwestern United States. RHS is part of ROWVA Community Unit School District 208, which serves the communities of Rio, Oneida, Wataga, Victoria, and Altona, and also includes ROWVA Junior High School, and Central Elementary School. The campus is 10 miles northeast of Galesburg, Illinois and serves a mixed village and rural residential community. The school is the only high school in the village of Oneida, and lies within the Galesburg micropolitan statistical area.

Academics
ROWVA High School teaches courses in the following academic departments:
 Agriculture
 Art
 Business
 Drivers Education
 English
 Family & Consumer Education
 History
 Industrial Arts
 Media
 Math
 Music
 PE & Health
 Science
 Spanish

History
The history of ROWVA high school is the history of its preceding component schools:
 Rio High School
 Oneida High School
 Victoria High School
 Altona and Walnut Grove High Schools
 ROVA High School
 Wataga High School

References

External links
 ROWVA High School
 ROWVA Community Unit School District #208

Public high schools in Illinois
Schools in Knox County, Illinois